Gloag is a surname, and may refer to:

Ann Gloag (born 1942), a Scottish business woman and charity campaigner
Helen Gloag (1750–1790), of Perthshire, Scotland became the Empress of Morocco
Helena Gloag (1909–1973), Scottish actress
Isobel Lilian Gloag (1865–1917), English painter
John Gloag (1896–1981), English novelist and nonfiction writer 
Joseph Gloag (ca. 1906–1977), Scottish marketing theorist and political activist
Julian Gloag (born 1930), English novelist and screenwriter
Paton James Gloag (1823–1906), Scottish minister and theological author
Robin Gloag (1943–2007), one of the founders of the business that today trades as Stagecoach Group
William Gloag (lawyer) (1865–1934), Scottish lawyer and academic
William Gloag, Lord Kincairney (1828–1909), Scottish judge

Scottish surnames